Iran (officially the Islamic Republic of Iran) competed at the 2020 Summer Olympics in Tokyo. Originally scheduled to take place during the summer of 2020, the Games were postponed to 23 July to 8 August 2021, because of the COVID-19 pandemic. Since the nation's debut in 1948, Iranian athletes have attended every edition of the Summer Olympic Games, with the exception of the 1980 and 1984 which they boycotted.

Medalists

Competitors

Archery

One Iranian archer qualified for the men's individual recurve by advancing to the semifinal stage and obtaining one of the three available spots at the 2019 Asian Championships in Bangkok, Thailand.

Athletics
 

Iranian athletes further achieved the entry standards, either by qualifying time or by world ranking, in the following track and field events (up to a maximum of 3 athletes in each event):

Track & road events

Field events

Badminton

Iranian women's badminton player, Sorayya Aghaei, got the allocation quotas from the Badminton World Federation after Airi Mikkela withdrew. She is the first ever women's badminton player to represent Iran at the Olympic Games.

Basketball

Indoor
Summary

Men's tournament

Iran men's basketball team qualified for the Olympics as the highest-ranked Asian squad at the 2019 FIBA World Cup in China, marking the country's return to the sport after a twelve-year absence.

Team roster

Group play

Boxing 

Iran entered two male boxers into the Olympic tournament. 19-year-old Danial Shahbakhsh (men's featherweight) and Asia's second-seeded boxer Seyed Shahin Mousavi (men's middleweight) secured the spots on the Iranian squad, by scoring a box-off triumph each in their respective weight divisions at the 2020 Asia & Oceania Qualification Tournament in Amman, Jordan.

Canoeing

Sprint
Iran qualified a single boat (men's K-1 1000 m) for the Games by winning the gold medal at the 2021 Asian Canoe Sprint Qualification Regatta in Pattaya, Thailand.

Qualification Legend: FA = Qualify to final (medal); FB = Qualify to final B (non-medal)

Cycling

Road
Iran entered one rider to compete in the men's Olympic road race, by virtue of his top 50 national finish (for men) in the UCI World Ranking.

Fencing

Iranian fencers qualified a full squad in the men's team sabre for the first time at the Games, as the highest-ranked nation from Asia outside the world's top four in the FIE Olympic Team Rankings.

Karate
 
Iran entered three karateka into the inaugural Olympic tournament. Sajjad Ganjzadeh (men's +75 kg), Sara Bahmanyar (women's 55 kg), and Hamideh Abbasali (women's +61 kg) qualified directly for their respective kumite categories by finishing among the top four karateka at the end of the combined WKF Olympic Rankings.  

Kumite

Rowing

Iran qualified one boat in the women's single sculls for the Games by winning the silver medal and securing the second of five berths available at the 2021 FISA Asia & Oceania Olympic Qualification Regatta in Tokyo, Japan. 

Qualification Legend: FA=Final A (medal); FB=Final B (non-medal); FC=Final C (non-medal); FD=Final D (non-medal); FE=Final E (non-medal); FF=Final F (non-medal); SA/B=Semifinals A/B; SC/D=Semifinals C/D; SE/F=Semifinals E/F; QF=Quarterfinals; R=Repechage

Shooting

Iranian shooters achieved quota places for the following events by virtue of their best finishes at the 2018 ISSF World Championships, the 2019 ISSF World Cup series, and Asian Championships, as long as they obtained a minimum qualifying score (MQS) by May 31, 2020.

Swimming 

Iran received a‌n Universality invitation from FINA to send a male swimmer to the 2020 Summer Olympics.

Table tennis
 
Iran entered one athlete into the table tennis competition at the Games. Rio 2016 Olympian Nima Alamian scored a zonal-match triumph for Central Asia to book a men's singles spot at the Asian Qualification Tournament in Doha, Qatar.

Taekwondo

Iran entered three athletes into the taekwondo competition at the Games. Armin Hadipour (men's 58 kg) qualified directly for their respective weight classes by finishing among the top five, while Mirhashem Hosseini received a spare berth freed up by the 2019 World Grand Slam winner in the men's lightweight category (68 kg), as the next highest-placed taekwondo practitioner, not yet qualified, in the WT Olympic Rankings. On the women's side, Nahid Kiani scored a semifinal victory in the lightweight category (57 kg) to book the remaining spot on the Iranian taekwondo squad at the 2021 Asian Qualification Tournament in Amman, Jordan.

Volleyball

Indoor
Summary

Men's tournament

Iran men's volleyball team qualified for the Olympics by winning the final match and securing an outright berth at the Asian Olympic Qualification Tournament in Jiangmen, China.

Team roster

Group play

Weightlifting

Iran entered two weightlifters into the Olympic competition. Rio 2016 Olympian and 2017 world champion Ali Hashemi (men's 109 kg) and the reigning Asian champion Ali Davoudi (men's +109 kg) secured one of the top eight slots each in their respective weight divisions based on the IWF Absolute World Rankings.

Wrestling

Iran qualified eleven wrestlers for each of the following classes into the Olympic competition. Five of them finished among the top six to book Olympic spots in the men's freestyle (57 and 86 kg), men's Greco-Roman (60, 77, and 130 kg) at the 2019 World Championships, while five additional licenses were awarded to the Iranian wrestlers, who progressed to the top two finals of their respective weight categories at the 2021 Asian Qualification Tournament in Almaty, Kazakhstan.

On February 19, 2020, United World Wrestling awarded an additional Olympic license to Iran in men's freestyle 125 kg, as a response to the doping violations on the Syrian and Uzbek wrestler at the World Championships.

Freestyle

Greco-Roman

See also

Iran at the 2020 Summer Paralympics

References

External links
 National Olympic committee of Iran
 IrFans2020 

Nations at the 2020 Summer Olympics
2020
2021 in Iranian sport